Lickskillet is an unincorporated community in Meade County, Kentucky, United States.

Notes

Unincorporated communities in Meade County, Kentucky
Unincorporated communities in Kentucky